The Kharkov Klezmer Band (Russian: Харьков Клезмер Бенд), also known as the Kharkiv Klezmer Band (Ukrainian: Харків Клезмер Бенд), is a klezmer band  from Kharkiv, Ukraine.

The band was founded in 1999 (in a country in which, as part of the Soviet Union, the performance of traditional Jewish music seemed effectively forbidden from the 1930s under Joseph Stalin until the early 1990s), under the leadership of Stanislav Raiko (Станіслав Райко), and comprises a group of conservatory-educated musicians.

According to the "Cradle of Klezmer" website, dedicated exclusively to Klezmer music, it is one of the most successful klezmer bands not only in Ukraine, but also throughout the countries comprising the former Soviet Union. The ensemble won the Best Klezmer Music Band award at the First Regional Jewish Cultural Festival in Kharkiv in June 2000, and was named the Best Klezmer Band at the Jewish Cultural Festival in Kyiv, also in June of the same year. They were awarded the Best Klezmer Band award at the 4th All-Ukrainian Jewish Arts Festival "Shalom Ukraïna" in November 2000.

The band has performed in a number of national and international festivals, including the Klezfest 2000, in Saint Petersburg, Russia, where the violinist, Stanislav Raiko, won the Jury’s Special Prize for Mastery and the "Klezmer Es Irodalom" (Klezmer and Literature) Festival in Budapest in 2000, along with the renowned Hungarian klezmer bands Tikva and Odessa Klezmer Band, as well as at the KlezFest in Ukraine ("Клезфест в Україні") regularly since 2000, a Klezmer festival that takes place every year since 1999 in Kyiv, the capital of Ukraine. They are also regular guests at the Klezfest in London, starting with the 2001 edition, and have participated in other London events, such as the 2003 "Ex-Bloc Reunion.

The Kharkiv Klezmer Band is known for its fine, classical technique and its "old-style" playing. In 2001, the ensemble was chosen to give the official welcoming concert for the Israeli President, Moshe Katzav, on his visit to Ukraine in 2001.

Band members 
In 2007, the band was essentially composed of the following four musicians:
 Stanislav Raiko (Станіслав Райко) - fiddle
 Gennadi Fomin (Геннадій Фомін) – clarinet
 Yuri Khainson or Heinson (Юрій Хаінсон) – accordion
 Artem Kolenchuk (Артем Коленчук) – double bass

whereas it has also included:
 Mykhailo Krupnikov (Михайло Крупніков) - voice
 Abbas Zulfuharov (Аббас Зульфугаров) - double bass

Discography

2004: Ticking Again (Music & Words/Fréa Records)
 2007: Radio-Chanson: Eight Stories about Jura Soyfer, a cabaret performance/play created by the Arabescs Theater-Studio (Театр-студію “Арабески”) of Kharkiv in honor of the Ukrainian-Austrian Jewish playwright and cabaret lyricist Jura Soyfer, published as a CD with booklet. Music by the Kharkiv Klezmer Band, lyrics by the Ukrainian poet Serhiy Zhadan.

See also
Klezmer
List of Klezmer bands

References

External links 
 Page about the band on http://www.klezmer.com.ua/news1/news22.php (in English)
 Page dedicated to the band on the UMKA website (in Ukrainian, Russian and English).
 The UMKA website (in Ukrainian, Russian and English) discusses the role played by the band in the "Radio-Chanson" project mentioned above under discography.
 Article about the band on the BBC Ukraine website (in Ukrainian)
 Article about the Kyiv KlezFest 2002, focussing on the band, with an interview in the newspaper Den' (The Day) (in Ukrainian)
 Article and interview with the band at the Klezmer-Kolybel website (in Russian)
 Listen to a song performed at the 2004 Kyiv KlezFest.
 Listen to songs from the album Ticking Again.

Ashkenazi Jewish culture in Ukraine
Culture in Kharkiv
Jews and Judaism in Kharkiv
Klezmer groups
Ukrainian musical groups
Musical groups established in 1999
1999 establishments in Ukraine
Musical groups from Kharkiv